Roser Tarragó Aymerich (born March 25, 1993) is a Spanish female water polo player. At the 2012 Summer Olympics, she competed for the Spain women's national water polo team in the women's event, where they won the silver medal.

Club career
She started her career in 2006 at CN Mataró. In 2018 she transferred to CE Mediterrani

College career
Tarragó attended University of California, Berkeley, playing on the women's water polo team from 2014 to 2018.

See also
 Spain women's Olympic water polo team records and statistics
 List of Olympic medalists in water polo (women)
 List of women's Olympic water polo tournament top goalscorers
 List of world champions in women's water polo
 List of World Aquatics Championships medalists in water polo

References

External links
 
 

1993 births
Living people
Water polo players from Barcelona
Spanish female water polo players
Water polo drivers
Water polo players at the 2012 Summer Olympics
Water polo players at the 2016 Summer Olympics
Water polo players at the 2020 Summer Olympics
Medalists at the 2012 Summer Olympics
Olympic silver medalists for Spain in water polo
World Aquatics Championships medalists in water polo
Medalists at the 2020 Summer Olympics
21st-century Spanish women
Sportswomen from Catalonia
Spanish expatriate sportspeople in the United States
Expatriate water polo players
California Golden Bears women's water polo players